Midwifery in the Middle Ages impacted women's work and health prior to the professionalization of medicine. During the Middle Ages in Western Europe, people relied on the medical knowledge of Roman and Greek philosophers, specifically Galen, Hippocrates, and Aristotle. These medical philosophers focused primarily on the health of men, and women's health issues were understudied. Thus, these philosophers did not focus on the baby and they encouraged women to handle women's issues. In fact, William L. Minkowski asserted that a male's reputation was negatively affected if he associated with or treated pregnant patients.  Resultantly, male physicians did not engage with pregnant patients, and women had a place in medicine as midwives. Myriam Greilsammer notes that an additional opposition to men's involvement in childbearing was that men should not associate with female genitalia throughout the secret practices of childbearing. The prevalence of this mindset allowed women to continue the practice of midwifery throughout most of the Medieval era with little or no male influence on their affairs. Minkowski writes that in Guy de Chauliac's fourteenth-century work Chirurgia magna, "he wrote that he was unwilling to discourse on midwifery because the field was dominated by women." However, changing views of medicine caused the women's role as midwife to be pushed aside as the professionalization of medical practitioners began to go up.

Background
It is suggested that most midwives came from the lower classes and were illiterate. More specifically, Monica H. Green notes that midwives were not required to be literate, and therefore many midwives were not. This suggests that the field of midwifery did not require prior formal education. Additionally, Green asserts that midwives differed from female surgeons and barbers because their spouses were not typically men who practiced medicine. During the late Middle Ages a few books were written for teaching midwifery for both women and men. Prior to this point, midwife manuals contained outdated information and were written by individuals who studied medical theory without physician influence.

Midwives were involved with births from all social classes to various degrees. The poorest women were typically helped by the women in their family and their neighbors rather than the midwives from the towns. Midwives learned their craft from other women within their communities and from their own childbearing experiences, because there was a lack of training within the field. Minkowski suggests that this absence of training can be attributed to the lack of texts on the topic. Thus, midwives often taught upcoming midwives through their personal experiences.  From the time they were small girls, women who would later become midwives were present at the births of other siblings and they observed the birthing process performed by the midwife or other female family members. Greilsammer writes that within Medieval art the midwife was shown with her medical instruments, but rarely in the act of her practice. Commonly the midwife's tools included scissors, linens, trays, baskets, and a birthing stool. Men were not allowed to view this birthing process. Greilsammer notes Belgian historian Louis Théo Maes' record of a fifteenth-century fine: "One Henne Vanden Damme, for having hid behind a staircase to eavesdrop upon his wife, she being in labour of  childbirth, which thing doth not befit a man, for the said eavesdropping was fined 15 livres."

How midwifery originated
It is suggested that midwives came to be established during the 15th century. This was shortly after the emergence of European schools and universities, but many of these early institutions excluded women from their programs and restricted their access to certain subject areas. At the time, men had monopolized many areas of the medical industry. This led to women's usage of natural remedies to help the sick and advance their practice of midwifery. However, because of preexisting social standards, it was difficult for women to gain the right to practice within other sectors of medicine. Few women practiced as surgeons and barbers, but many of these women were married to men in similar fields. Thus midwifery became women's primary role within the medical world. This conflict led to false accusations of witchcraft because society imposed a stark boundary upon women's involvement in medicine and did not approve of their usage of natural remedies.

Women's health was viewed as women's business, and men did not wish to interfere with their practice. This social idea created a barrier between men and women in the healthcare industry. Thus, women were the primary caretakers for women in all health matters. It was believed that women knew the female body best; therefore, providing care to the women was their primary role within medicine. This division in turn also led to women not concerning themselves with men's medical matters. It's also important to understand that this conflict led to a sexual division of which individuals were allowed to treat others, and impacted the type of healthcare that women had received during this time period, but also, the type of health care that they were allowed to give.

Role of the midwife
Midwives were involved with births from all social classes to various degrees. The poorest women were typically helped by the women in their family and their neighbors rather than the midwives from the towns. In towns, government compensated midwives with "tax exempt status or a small pension" for their service within the community. This compensation placed a lot of emphasis on a midwife's reputation. Beginning in the early fourteenth century, town officials started recording some midwife activities in municipal account books; for example, Greilsammer cites a 1312 record from Bruges stating "Communal expenses – Item, by Copp. Voers. Two midwives who were called to see a newborn infant found in front of the city walls on Christmas Eve, 20 solidi." In more exceptional situations, if the midwife had a much respected reputation, they may also serve as court midwife. This involvement included working for individuals like the French queen.

Regulations on the practice of midwifery
Unlike male medical practitioners, midwives did not participate in guilds or attempt to organize themselves. Green writes that medical licensure originated in the mid-fifteenth century. Typically the church or legislature mandated these requirements, and the earliest known example is from Regensburg in 1452. Minkowski argued that the organization of midwives commenced once a medical "hierarchy" was constructed "with male doctors at the top." Greilsammer notes that during this time period society aimed to implement midwives into this medical organization. Lawmakers hoped that regulation would improve the quality of care given by midwives. Greilsammer further notes that "Brussels was in 1424 the first town in Europe to enact detailed regulations regarding the functions of midwives," with "similar measures... enacted in Bruges in 1509 and in Mechelen in 1536."

Regulation of midwifery was also an ecclesiastical concern: Kathryn Taglia writes that during the fourteenth century, midwives were instructed on how to properly baptize newborns. Church members wanted to ensure that midwives understood the process of baptism and the sacrament of baptism. Such ecclesiastical and secular regulatory introductions, harmed midwives role and reputation within society. Greilsammer argues that this could have led to decreasing employment rates for women during the Middle Ages. Such developments forced many midwives out of the craft and were replaced by men.

Medieval  midwives of note
Only a handful of medieval midwives have been identified for whom we have anything more than a name. Green notes that, Bourgot L'Obliere worked for the French queen as a midwife. This involvement with the queen was resultant of her outstanding reputation as a successful midwife.  Green also identified Asseline Alexandre, a woman who attended the births of the Duchess of Burgundy in the 1370s. In addition to these notable midwives, several women were identified in English poll tax records from the later 14th century. These women included Matilda Kembere and Marg[ery?]
Josy in Reading and Felicia Tracy in Canterbury.

Although often referred to as a midwife, the 12th-century Salernitan medical writer Trota of Salerno was rather a general medical practitioner. She specialized in women's conditions, described postpartum repairs, and seems to have seen the supervision of normal birth as the province of others.

The practice of licensing midwives in northern cities of Europe originated in the 14th century, but no extant written licenses from this period have yet been identified. Rather, much of what we know of individual midwives comes from legal records and court proceedings. For example, we know of the Muslim midwives Blanca and Xenci who were brought from Toledo to serve at the court of King Carlos III of Navarre (r. 1387-1425). Additionally, a mother and daughter “dynasty” of Muslim midwives, doña Fatima and doña Haxa, who attended the births of, Catalina, the queen of Castille, and Blanca, daughter of Carlos of Navarre and herself queen of Navarre by 1425.  In late 15th- and early 16th-century Brie (a suburb of Paris), midwives can be found using the ecclesiastical courts to secure or confirm their professional advantages. For example, we learn of the midwife Isabelle Rougemaille who brought suit in 1500/1501 against a potential client because that woman had allowed another birth attendant to assist her in a recent delivery.  Although midwives were occasionally chastened for such offenses as baptizing fetuses that seem to have been born dead (likely because of Christian parental concerns for the child's immortal soul), thus far the only known case of a midwife being prosecuted for the death of a woman under her care is the 1403 trial of a Jewish midwife in the French city of Marseille, Floreta d'Ays.  That case involves a level of anti-Semitism otherwise undocumented in Marseille in this period.

Questions of witchcraft

Witchcraft became associated with midwifery when unsuccessful pregnancies became apparent to society. Reliance on naturalistic remedies and a lack of training caused rural midwives to have many unsuccessful deliveries during the time.  When births were consistently unsuccessful, the accusations of witchcraft began.

Regulations on the practice of midwifery and the early witch trials occurred during the same time period. This correlation continues to cause debate surrounding the connection between midwifery and the witch trials. Several historians have discussed these connections between "witchcraft and midwives."

On one side of this debate, historians argue that Western European countries feared the knowledge of midwives and equated this to the practice of witchcraft. During this time, the church and state imposed restrictions on midwives, and required that midwives were supervised. Supervisors guaranteed that midwives followed their religious oath against the practice of witchcraft. Additionally, Greilsammer notes that midwives were commonly tried for witchcraft because of their medicinal knowledge. If natural remedies, unknown to the general public, were used, midwives were questioned about their associations with witchcraft.

On the other side of this issue, Taglia argues that ecclesiastical legislation in France feared witchcraft associated with midwifery because they thought that midwives would not perform baptisms correctly. Additionally, Harley and Green note that even though some midwives were tried for witchcraft the witch trials encompassed many groups of people. Harley and Green also argue that midwives only account for a small percentage of the individuals accused of witchcraft. Most notably, Harley argues that several severe cases create the stereotype that midwives made up the majority of the witch trials.

After the Medieval era, midwifery became more structured and professionalized from the influence of legislation passed during the later part of the era and the influence of the medical profession. Over time it became the profession that we know today as midwifery.

References

Medieval perspective bibliography

Midwifery